The 1915 Liverpool Kirkdale by-election was a parliamentary by-election held in England on 15 February 1915 for the House of Commons constituency of Liverpool Kirkdale.

Vacancy
The by-election was caused by the resignation of the sitting Conservative Member of Parliament (MP), Colonel Gerald Kyffin-Taylor due to his military commitments.

The writ for the by-election was moved in the Commons on 10 February by Lord Edmund Talbot, the MP for Chichester.

Candidates
During World War I, the major political parties had agreed not to contest by-elections when seats held by their respective parties fell vacant. The Conservative candidate De Fonblanque Pennefather was therefore returned unopposed, without any need for a vote.
He took his seat in the Commons on 17 February.

References

See also
 Liverpool Kirkdale constituency
 Kirkdale, Merseyside
 1898 Liverpool Kirkdale by-election
 1907 Liverpool Kirkdale by-election
 1910 Liverpool Kirkdale by-election
 List of United Kingdom by-elections (1900–1918)

Liverpool Kirkdale by-election
Kirkdale, 1915
Liverpool Kirkdale by-election
1910s in Liverpool
Liverpool Kirkdale by-election